Urmia University (Danushgah-e Arumih) (also known as the University of Urmia) is a public university in West Azarbaijan province, Iran. The main campus of Urmia University is in Nazlu (or Nazloo), in the vicinity of Urmia. It has six campuses, seven schools, more than 14,000 students, and several exclusive research centers including Microelectronic, Antenna and Microwave Laboratory, Nanotechnology, MEMS, and Artemia. Urmia University also has two satellite campuses in Khoy and Miyandoab city. Nazlu campus of Urmia University is the biggest university campus in size in the northwest of Iran. Urmia University is ranked as one of Iran's "Grade A" universities by Ministry of Science, Research and Technology.

History

Westminster Medical College (1879–1915)

Urmia University is founded in the location of Westminster Medical College (also known for its affiliated Westminster Hospital), was established by Joseph Plumb Cochran in 1879 in the city of Urmia. The Westminster Medical College is considered as the first attempt to establish a higher education institution in Urmia. Cochran, an American citizen who was born in Urmia to Presbyterian missionary parents, and he spent his entire professional life in developing the medical college and hospital in Urmia. The website of Urmia University credits attempts of Cochran for "lowering the infant mortality rate in the region". Cochran also established the first modern Western hospital in Iran.

The medical faculty Cochran established was joined by several other American medical doctors including Dr. Wright, Dr. Homlz, Thomas Langdon van Norden (1802–1871), and Emma T. Miller. They lived their entire life in Urmia. S. Oshana Badal (1853–1911) was the first graduate student of the school in 1883. After graduation, Badal briefly went to Edinburgh, Scotland at the request of Cochran to extend his knowledge. When Badal returned he was the first assistant physician of Cochran.

Two princes of the Qajar dynasty visited the Westminster Medical College, Mozafar-ad-Din in the winter of 1890; and Naser-ad-Din Shah.

The certificates of the graduates from Westminster Medical College were jointly signed by Cochran and King Mozaffar-edin Shah. This college continued to educate students in medical science and after the death of Cochran in 1905 due to typhoid fever, Badal took over the school until his death in 1911 also from typhoid fever. The school was briefly named Cochran Memorial Hospital after his death.

Harry P. Packard (1874–1954) took over the full responsibilities of the hospital and college around 1906, until the closure in 1915. American doctors Laura McComb Muller and Wilder P. Ellis joined Packard, prior to the closure of the school. In 1909, Emma T. Miller left the college and Urmia.

In 1907, Samuel Clement built a New Westminster Hospital in the inner city of Urmia. The office of Joseph Plume Cochran and his medical college within the wooden building are preserved in the city campus of Urmia University.

Later re-establishment and developments (1965–present)
The formal foundation for current Urmia University was laid in 1965 when the Agricultural College of Rezaeiye was established. Shabani was appointed as the first consular of the newly established college. In 1969, Jafar Rassi was appointed as chancellor to continue the expansion of the University. In 1970, the Iranian Ministry of Science assigned further development of the college to the university. An agreement was signed between the Iranian government and the Near East Foundation in the United States to establish a four-year program. Later, Dr. Rassi was appointed as the new consular of the college. Dr. Rassi, the longest-serving consular of Urmia University till date, established the Animal Science and Science Departments. Under his leadership, the college started a four-year program of bachelor's degree. He also established a partnership with European and American schools to establish an exchange of scholars. He planned the expansion in Nazlu Campus which is now the primary location for the University. With the new developments, the complex was renamed as the University of Rezaeye in 1977.

After the Iranian Revolution in Iran, the name of this university was changed to Urmia University. In 1980, the faculty of Medical Science was established. As part of the Iranian Ministry of Health, Urmia University of Medical Sciences detached itself from the main school in 1985. The Faculty of Humanitarian Science was established in 1989 and Faculty of Engineering was established in 1990.

Campuses
 
Urmia University has six campuses, all of which are located in West Azarbaijan Provence. The main campus is located in Nazlu on the  road from Urmia to Serow. Here is a list of all campuses:

Nazlu campus, the main campus, in Nazlu village.
City campus in Urmia city.
Literature campus inside Urmia city.
School of Economics campus  of Serow Rd.
School of Arts campus inside Urmia city.
Khoy campus

Buildings
One of the famous buildings of Urmia University is the Wooden Building, the oldest building in the city campus, formally the Westminster Medical College building.

In the present day, most of the major buildings of Urmia University are in Nazlu campus (also spelled as Nazloo):

Schools
Urmia University consists of eleven schools including:

Research centers 
Artemia and Aquatic Animals Research Center Research activities related to Artemia and the ecosystem of Lake Urmia at Urmia University began with the establishment of the Artemia Research Laboratory in 1373 and then promoted to the Artemia and Aquatic Research Center by Dr. Nasir Agh. The firm support of Urmia University officials and the day-to-day activities of the Center's founder made it the reference center for Artemia in Iran and the entire Middle East and Central Asia region. With the development of the Center's research activities in various fields and the establishment of new research groups in 2004, the research center was promoted to the Artemia and Aquaculture Research Institute.
MicroElectronics Research Center (MRC)  In 1996, a research group in the field of microelectronics was formed under the direction of Dr. Kh. A. Hadidi at Urmia University. In 2000, the research group received the license under the title of "Microelectronics Research Center" from the Ministry of Science, Research and Technology. In 2004, the center was upgraded to the Microelectronics Research Institute. For seven years, the institute has also won the title of Best and Only Institute of Microelectronics in Iran.
Urmia MEMS Center (UMC)  The center was established in 2004 with the investment of Iran's Industrial Development and Renovation Organization under the direction of Dr. E. Abbaspour. UMC is one of the most advanced technology projects in the country which has been built in an area of 10,000 square meters and with an infrastructure of 2,200 square meters at the city campus of Urmia University, in which the facilities and equipment of a semi-industrial clean room are located.
Biological Sciences Research Center  The Biomedical Research Center of Urmia University was established in 2000 with the approval of the Ministry of Science, Research and Technology. Currently, the Institute continues its work in four areas: agricultural biotechnology, cellular and molecular biotechnology, biotechnology, and biotechnology of pharmaceutical and industrial plants.
Urmia Lake Research Institute (ULRI) Established in 1998 as part of Artemia and Aquatic Animals Research Institute, it has been upgraded to Urmia Lake Research Institute (ULRI) in 2013. The institute currently has 4 departments, 20 scientific staff and 5 laboratories with sophisticated equipment. ULRI was involved in many national and regional projects on Urmia Lake.
Nanotechnology Center Since the beginning of fall semester in 2010, the nanotechnology institute of Urmia commenced the initial academic activities with taking MSc. students in nano-chemistry as well as nano-physics degrees. The nanotechnology institute of Urmia has taken modern laboratories comprising organic chemistry, thermo-analysis, electrochemistry, and nano-electronic as well as nano-composite.
Computer Emergency Response Team  The Urmia University Computer Emergency Response Team (CSIRT) has been set up to provide information, support, and relief, and focus on the Internet security of objects. The CSIRT of Urmia University, the only Internet security center in the province was established in April 2016.

Presidents

Notable alumni
Isa Kalantari, former Minister of Agriculture and Vice President of Iran in environmental affairs.
Mohammad Oraz, first Iranian national to successfully climb Mount Everest.

See also
List of universities in Iran
Higher education in Iran

References

External links 

 Papers of Mary Paterson Van Norden, 1866-1973, from Schlesinger Library, Radcliffe Institute, Harvard University

 
Educational institutions established in 1965
Buildings and structures in Urmia
1965 establishments in Iran